The Kanakadurga Flyover (also known as Durga Temple Flyover) is a Flyover Spanning the Krishna River and Prakasam Barrage in Vijayawada, India. It was inaugurated on 16 October 2020 by Nitin Gadkari.

Geography 
The Kanakadurga Flyover is built around Indrakeeladri Hill on which Kanaka Durga Temple is located. It spans from Bhavanipuram near Gollapudi to PNBS. The road widening works are done up to Kanaka Durga Varadhi. This flyover crosses Krishna River, Prakasam Barrage and  Buckingham Canal near Indrakeeladri hill, and meets NH65 near PNBS.

History 
After Bifurcation a Flyover was Proposed by The Government of Andhra Pradesh to Control Traffic Flow Between the new State Capital Amaravati And the de facto Capital Hyderabad on the Existing 15-20 Foot Highway Around Durga temple. The Construction of The Kanakadurga Flyover was Started by  Soma  Company of Hyderabad on 22 November 2015 and the Road Level Bridge was Completed by 2016 for Krishna Pushkaralu. The Flyover is very Difficult to Construct Due to its Plan and on The River Krishna. The Land Acquisition For this Project Cost Around 100 Crores for The shifting of Utilities like Drinking Water Pipelines along The Road. Later the Deadline was extended to March 2020, after having been previously extended in August 2017, March 2018, and August 2018. The  Construction  was  Completed  by  30th, August, 2020 .

Construction 
It is a six-lane highway with a width of 23.7 metres. It is the third of its kind in India by using pre-stress technology. It is estimated to have cost 282.4 crores, which was later adjusted to 440 crores for inflation. It has a unique and complex design with a six-lane corridor supported by a single pillar. There are two underpasses in the flyover master plan. Vertical gardening has been done on the column of this flyover along with a park for F1H2o to celebrate the 2018 F1H2o World Championship in Amaravati. The district administration has decided to allow traffic through the flyover prior to its completion to prevent traffic bottlenecks and congestion.

See also 
 Kanaka Durga Varadhi
 APCRDA
Benz Circle Flyover

References

Bridges in India
Transport in Vijayawada
Buildings and structures in Vijayawada
Bridges and flyovers in Vijayawada